This page lists the armoury emblazons, heraldic descriptions, or coats of arms of the communes in Nord (Q-Z)

Complete lists of Nord armorial pages 

 Armorial of the Communes of Nord (A–C)
 Armorial of the Communes of Nord (D–H)
 Armorial of the Communes of Nord (I–P)
 Armorial of the Communes of Nord (Q–Z)

Q

R

S

T

U

V

W

Z

External links 
 Liste des blasons des communes du nord
 Liste des blasonnements des communes de Flandre et d'Artois
 La page du généalogiste fou

References 

Nord (French department)
Nord